Hufangqiao Station is a station on Line 7 of the Beijing Subway.

First & Last Time
Beijing West Railway Station — Hua Zhuang
The first train 5:41
The last train 23:26
Hua Zhuang — Beijing West Railway Station
The first train 5:41
The last train 22:56

Station Layout 
The station has an underground island platform.

Exits 
There are 4 exits, lettered A, B, C, and D. Exits A and C are accessible.

References

Railway stations in China opened in 2014
Beijing Subway stations in Xicheng District